Axinella is a genus of sponges in the family Axinellidae  first described in 1862 by Eduard Oscar Schmidt. Species of Axinella occur in the Indian and Pacific Oceans. Most of these sponges are smaller than 20 cm, and have a yellow or orange colour.

List of species 
The following species are recognized within the genus Axinella:

Axinella acanthelloides Pattanayak, 2006
Axinella alba (Descatoire, 1966)
Axinella alborana Sitjà & Maldonado, 2014
Axinella amorpha Tanita & Hoshino, 1989
Axinella anamesa (de Laubenfels, 1957)
Axinella antarctica (Koltun, 1964)
Axinella arborescens Ridley & Dendy, 1886
Axinella arctica Vosmaer, 1885
Axinella aruensis (Hentschel, 1912)
Axinella australiensis Bergquist, 1970
Axinella babici Vacelet, 1961
Axinella badungensis Alvarez, de Voogd & van Soest, 2016
Axinella balinensis Alvarez, de Voogd & van Soest, 2016
Axinella bidderi Burton, 1959
Axinella blanca Koltun, 1959
Axinella brondstedi Bergquist, 1970
Axinella bubarinoides Dendy, 1922
Axinella cannabina (Esper, 1794)
Axinella centrotylota Pansini, 1984
Axinella ceylonensis (Dendy, 1905)
Axinella cinnamomea (Nardo, 1833)
Axinella clathrata Dendy, 1897
Axinella columna Sim, Kim & Byeon, 1990
Axinella convexa Hoshino, 1981
Axinella copiosa Thiele, 1898
Axinella cornua Sim, Kim & Byeon, 1990
Axinella corrugata (George & Wilson, 1919)
Axinella crassa (Carter, 1885)
Axinella crinita Thiele, 1905
Axinella cylindratus Hoshino, 1981
Axinella damicornis (Esper, 1794)
Axinella digitiformis Lehnert & van Soest, 1996
Axinella dissimilis (Bowerbank, 1866)
Axinella donnani (Bowerbank, 1873)
Axinella dragmaxioides Burton, 1959
Axinella egregia Topsent, 1892
Axinella elegans (Dendy, 1924)
Axinella estacioi Carballo & Garcia-Gomez, 1995
Axinella flabelloreticulata Burton, 1959
Axinella flustra Topsent, 1892
Axinella globula Brøndsted, 1924
Axinella guiteli Topsent, 1896
Axinella halichondrioides Dendy, 1905
Axinella hispida Koltun, 1959
Axinella incrustans Thiele, 1898
Axinella infundibuliformis (Linnaeus, 1758)
Axinella kirki Dendy, 1897
Axinella labyrinthica Dendy, 1889
Axinella lamellata (Dendy, 1905)
Axinella lesueuri Topsent, 1932
Axinella lifouensis Lévi & Lévi, 1983
Axinella loribellae Alvarez & Hooper, 2009
Axinella macrostyla Babiç, 1922
Axinella mahonensis Ferrer-Hernandez, 1916
Axinella manus Dendy, 1905
Axinella massalis Burton, 1959
Axinella meandroides Alvarez, van Soest & Rützler, 1998
Axinella meloniformis Carter, 1885
Axinella minor Thomas, 1981
Axinella minuta Lévi, 1957
Axinella natalensis (Kirkpatrick, 1903)
Axinella nayaritensis Carballo, Bautista-Guerrero & Cruz-Barraza, 2018
Axinella parva Picton & Goodwin, 2007
Axinella perlucida Topsent, 1896
Axinella pilifera Carter, 1885
Axinella plumosa (Lévi & Lévi, 1983)
Axinella polycapella de Laubenfels, 1953
Axinella polypoides Schmidt, 1862
Axinella pomponiae Alvarez, van Soest & Rützler, 1998
Axinella profunda Ridley & Dendy, 1886
Axinella proliferans Ridley, 1884
Axinella pseudominuta Bibiloni, 1993
Axinella pyramidata Stephens, 1916
Axinella quercifolia (Keller, 1889)
Axinella richardsoni Bergquist, 1970
Axinella rugosa (Bowerbank, 1866)
Axinella salicina Schmidt, 1868
Axinella setosa Hentschel, 1929
Axinella shoemakeri (Laubenfels, 1936)
Axinella sinoxea Alvarez & Hooper, 2009
Axinella solenoeides de Laubenfels, 1957
Axinella spatula Sitjà & Maldonado, 2014
Axinella symbiotica Whitelegge, 1907
Axinella tenuidigitata Dendy, 1905
Axinella tenuis Thiele, 1898
Axinella torquata Brøndsted, 1924
Axinella trichophora Hentschel, 1929
Axinella vaceleti Pansini, 1984
Axinella vasonuda Topsent, 1904
Axinella vellerea Topsent, 1904
Axinella ventilabrum Burton, 1959
Axinella vermiculata Whitelegge, 1907
Axinella verrucosa (Esper, 1794)
Axinella villosa Carter, 1885
Axinella waltonsmithi (de Laubenfels, 1953)
Axinella weltnerii (Lendenfeld, 1897)

References 

Axinellidae
Sponge genera